HD 93083 b is an extrasolar planet orbiting the K-type subgiant star HD 93083 in Antlia constellation. It is probably much less massive than Jupiter, although only the minimum mass is known. The planet's mean distance from the star is about half that of Earth,  and the orbit is slightly eccentric. This planet was discovered by the HARPS search team.

The planet HD 93083 b is named Melquíades. The name was selected in the NameExoWorlds campaign by Colombia, during the 100th anniversary of the IAU. Melquíades is a fictional character in the novel One Hundred Years of Solitude, who walks around Macondo (name of the host star HD 93083).

HD 93083 b lies within the habitable zone of its host star. Stability analysis reveals that the orbits of Earth-sized planets located in HD 93083 b's Trojan points would be stable for long periods of time.

See also
 High Accuracy Radial Velocity Planet Searcher or HARPS

References

External links 
 
 Corot Simulation

Exoplanets discovered in 2005
Giant planets
Antlia
Exoplanets detected by radial velocity
Exoplanets with proper names
Giant planets in the habitable zone